Censorship was ranked among the world's most extreme in 2020. Reporters Without Borders ranked Iran 173 out of 180 countries in the World Press Freedom Index, which ranks countries from 1 to 180 based on the level of freedom of the press. 
Reporters Without Borders described Iran as “one of the world’s five biggest prisons for media personnel" in the 40 years since the revolution. In the Freedom House Index, Iran scored low on political rights and civil liberties and has been classified as 'not free.'

Iran has strict regulations when it comes to internet censorship. The Iranian government and the Islamic Revolutionary Guard Corps persistently block social media, such as Facebook and Twitter, as well as many popular websites such as Blogger, HBO, YouTube, and Netflix.  Despite the state-wide ban, some Iranian politicians use social networks to communicate with their followers, including Twitter and Facebook.

Internet censorship in Iran and the NIN function similarly to the Great Firewall of China. Stricter monitoring and the National Information Network (NIN) were unveiled during the 2019 Iranian protests. These restrictions made it more difficult for videos of unrest in Iran to be posted or viewed on social media.

After YouTube was blocked in Iran, the Aparat website was founded as an Iranian video-sharing platform. In 2020, Aparat's CEO was sentenced to 10 years in prison due to the activity of one of the platform's users.  Millions of Iranians stay connected on social media despite the government's restrictions  by using proxies or virtual private networks (VPNs), which hide the location of a user.

On November 17, 2019, in response to fuel protests, the country shut down nearly all internet access. This reduced internet traffic down to 5% of ordinary levels.

In practice 
After the Islamic revolution in 1979, the Ministry of Culture and Islamic Guidance, also known as the Ershad, came into existence to control all cultural activities in the country. From that moment on, all musicians, writers, artists, and media makers needed permits that allowed them to publicly display their works. The Ershad is in charge of providing these permits and judges whether each producer's work aligns with Islamic culture. Different departments within the Ershad are responsible for interpreting what fits and doesn't fit with Islamic culture and should therefore be censored. At the head of this bureaucratic organization are both the Minister of Culture and Islamic Guidance and the Supreme Leader, Ayatollah Khamenei. Journalists also need a license before they can legally start working. Licenses for journalists are provided by the Press Supervisory Board, and a license is withdrawn if a journalist criticizes the State.

Censorship in Iran is not just an act by an individual. It's a process that involves interaction and negotiation. The complexity and ambiguity of the system stimulate self-censorship and create a culture of censorship. However, not everything is negotiable. Criticism of the Supreme Leader, for example, is strictly prohibited. Any journalist or artist who does not obey the Iranian State can face severe punishment.

Laws and regulations 

The Iranian Constitution contains many articles which restrict the flow of information. However, the phrases in its articles are often ambiguously worded. These vague articles leave too much room for interpretation about what's legal and what isn't. Censorship regulation is, therefore, a highly subjective practice. It depends on the interpretation of the individual bureaucrat in charge, who dictates whether censorship will be applied or not. The articles in the Constitution can, therefore, easily be used by government officials who want to suppress dissenting voices. The Iranian Constitution does not protect journalists and artists by giving them rights.

The Iranian Constitution states very general rules concerning freedom of expression. Article 24 states: "Publications and the press have freedom of expression except when it is detrimental to the fundamental principles of Islam or the rights of the public. The details of this exception will be specified by law." Till now, there is no existing law that specifies the details of this exception.

Article 3 of The Press Law states: "The press have the right to publish the opinions, constructive criticisms, suggestions and explanations of individuals and government officials for public information while duly observing the Islamic teachings and the best interest of the community." The first part of this law describes a lot of freedoms for the press. However, the second part of this freedom is restricted by very broad exceptions. Anything can be labeled as against "the interest of the community," and therefore, the press should always be careful.

Article 500 of the penal code states: "Anyone who engages in any type of propaganda against the Islamic Republic of Iran or in support of opposition groups and associations shall be sentenced to three months to one year of imprisonment." What is seen as propaganda can not always be found. This vagueness gives judges a lot of room for interpreting what is against the law and should therefore be punished.

History 
Iran has a long history with censorship, especially with reactive measures. This means information in newspapers, on television, or on the internet is withheld from the public, which has been present for ages. These forms of censorship were used for suppression of opposition and for influencing public opinion. Censorship in Iran comes in waves which exist parallel to political crises. In situations of crisis, the state tries to get power back by controlling information streams and thereby denying opposition groups' influence on the public debate. During the crisis that followed the nationalization of the oil industry in the 1950s, censorship was intensified to protect the Shah's reputation. During the 1970s, in the years preceding the revolution, censorship was less present in Iranian society. This created big developments in Iranian literature production. However, in later years, the Islamic Revolution intensified censorship once again. The new Islamic leaders tried to consolidate their power by enforcing new regulations. And lastly, in the crisis after the 2009 elections, communication channels were shut down to prevent major uprisings.

Subject matter and agenda

Political
Censorship in Iran is largely seen as a measure to maintain the stability of the country. Censorship helps prevent unapproved reformists, Counter-Revolutionaries, or religious proponents, peaceful or otherwise, from organizing themselves and spreading their ideals. In 2007, for example, five women were charged with "endangering national security" and sentenced to prison for collecting over a million signatures supporting the abolishment of laws discriminating against women.

Some of the topics explicitly banned from discussion in the media by the Supreme National Security Council include Iran's economic troubles, the possibility of new international sanctions targeted at Iran's nuclear program, negotiations with the United States regarding Iraq, social taboos, unrest among Iran's ethnic minorities, and the arrests in 2007 of Haleh Esfandiari, Kian Tajbakhsh and Ali Shakeri.

Media

Two notable crackdowns on the Iranian press occurred on August 7–11, 1979. This was early in the Islamic Revolution when the Khamenei forces were consolidating control, and dozens of non-Islamist newspapers were banned under a new press law banning "counter-revolutionary policies and acts."

Despite a ban on satellite television, dishes are on many Iranian rooftops, and people have access to dozens of Persian-language channels, including the Voice of America, broadcasting a daily dose of politics and entertainment. Thirty percent of Iranians watch satellite channels, but observers say the figures are likely to be higher.

A number of unauthorized foreign radio services also broadcast into Iran on shortwave and encounter occasional jamming by the Iranian government due to their controversial nature. Such services include a popular phone-in program from Kol Israel (Voice of Israel), where callers must dial a number in Europe to be rerouted to the studio in Israel in order to protect against persecution for communicating with an enemy state.

In March 2009, Amoo Pourang (Uncle Pourang), an Iranian children's television show watched by millions of Iranian children three times a week on state TV, was pulled off after a child appearing on the program called his pet monkey "Mahmoud Ahmadinejad," live on air.

In September 2017, Reporters Without Borders (RSF) condemned the Iranian judicial system and intelligence services (VEVAK) for their attempts to put pressure on Iranian journalists based abroad and on their families still in Iran. This was done to influence the Persian-language sections of international media outlets such as BBC Persian service to broadcast pro-government programs and news.

Internet 

In the first decade of the 21st century, Iran experienced a great surge in Internet usage. With 20 million people on the Internet, Iran currently has the second-highest percentage of its population online in the Middle East, after Israel. When initially introduced, the Internet services provided by the government within Iran were comparatively open. Many users saw the internet as an easy way to get around Iran's strict press laws. In recent years, Internet service providers have been told to block access to pornographic and anti-religion websites. The ban has also targeted gaming platforms, such as Steam, as well as popular social networking sites, like Facebook and YouTube, alongside some news websites.

Internet usage has also been shut down country-wide to limit the organization of protests. The Iranian government and the Islamic Revolutionary Guards Sepah are always blocking popular social networks like Facebook, Twitter, and more. But they decided to shut down the Internet during the protests in Iran in 2019. Many internet businesses were shut down during the 2019–20 Iranian protests.

Banned media 
In 2010, the Iranian government started using cropping and other editing techniques to censor foreign movies deemed offensive or immoral. The strategy behind this was that citizens would stop seeking out illegal or uncensored versions if approved versions of the films were broadcast. Censorship cut out the following: alcoholic beverages, sorcery, men and women sitting too close together or touching, closeups of women's faces, low necklines on shirts, and many others. People are sometimes edited out, or objects are strategically placed to cover what is considered inappropriate. For example, a low neckline on a woman's shirt is edited to be more modest. Dialogue in foreign films is also oftentimes rewritten. For example, romantic implications are replaced with marriage proposals.

Books 

The Satanic Verses
Memories of My Melancholy Whores

Films

The Circle
Crimson Gold
Half Moon
Offside
Persepolis
Tcherike-ye Tara
Ten
Santouri
Time of Love
300

Video games

Battlefield 3
ARMA 3
1979 Revolution: Black Friday

Religious
The agents of censorship are sometimes not official government employees but religious organizations. In 2007, after student newspapers at Amirkabir University of Technology published articles suggesting that no human being—including Muhammad—could be infallible, eight student leaders were arrested and taken to Evin Prison.

Distributing Christian literature in Persian (also known as Farsi) is prohibited.

See also

Freedom of speech in Iran
Internet censorship in Iran
2019 Internet blackout in Iran
National Information Network of Iran
Nashravaran Journalistic Institute
Islamic Republic of Iran Broadcasting
Islamic Revolutionary Court for slandering the Supreme Leaders
Communications in Iran
International rankings of Iran
Media in Iran
Iran Electoral Archive
Maziar Bahari

References

External links

 ARTICLE19, "Tightening the Net: Internet Freedoms in Iran" -a monitoring series of reports on the state of internet censorship in Iran.
Hejazi, Arash, ‘You don’t deserve to be published’ Book Censorship in Iran, LOGOS: The Journal of the World Book Community, Volume 22, Number 1, 2011, pp. 53–62(10), 
Music censorship incidents in Iran – reported by Freemuse
Committee against censorship (Iran Proxy) – Anti Censorship Committee in Iran
Pictures of Iranian Censorship – Examples of Iranian Censorship in Western Magazines
I will not register my site – Antiregistering website & blogs logo and Censorship google bombing.]
Banned Magazine, the online journal of censorship and secrecy
Iran's Digital Underground by David Feith, The Wall Street Journal, 10 August 2009
Iran Electoral Archive – Media & Censorship

Mass media in Iran
Communications in Iran